Apostolic Vicariate of Herzegovina was an apostolic vicariate of the Catholic Church in the Ottoman Herzegovina that existed between 1846 and 1881, when it was abolished with the Diocese of Mostar-Duvno established on its place.

The exact date when the Apostolic Vicariate of Herzegovina was established is not known, but it was sometimes in 1846. It was established on the initiative of the Herzegovinian Franciscans and with aid from Ali Pasha Rizvanbegović, the vizier of Herzegovina. Its first apostolic vicar was Bishop Rafael Barišić, a Franciscan, previously apostolic vicar of Bosnia. The establishment of the vicariate in Herzegovina reinvigorated the religious life of Catholics.

The vicariate was abolished on 5 July 1881 by Pope Leo XIII, who established the Diocese of Mostar-Duvno in its place. Paškal Buconjić, the last apostolic vicar of Herzegovina was named the first bishop of Mostar-Duvno.

History

Ottoman rule 
In 1482, Herzegovina was conquered by the Ottomans. Many people fled after the conquest or migrated later. Franciscan monasteries were destroyed and churches turned into mosques. In the 16th century, the last Franciscan monasteries perished in Herzegovina, however, they remained active among the Catholics. In the 17th century, bishops in West Herzegovina were no longer present among the population, so the bishop of Makarska expanded his jurisdictions over West Herzegovina, including the Diocese of Duvno.

In 1709 and 1722, there were two petitions from the Catholics from Bosnia and Herzegovina to the Propaganda to send them a bishop that would reside among them. In 1722, the Propaganda tried to return the seat of the Bishop of Duvno that would have the jurisdiction over them, asking for the advice from the archbishops of Split and Zadar as well as the bishop of Makarska, however, they opposed claiming that the "Church of Duvno is canonically united" with their dioceses. On a session of the Propaganda from April 1722, it was concluded that the Propaganda could draw the new borders of the Diocese of Duvno, however, no further efforts were made on the matter.

The Catholics of Bosnia and Herzegovina continued sending the petitions to the Propaganda in 1723, 1729, and 1734. In 1734, the Propaganda started to study the matter inquiring about the status of Catholics in Bosnia and Herzegovina and the Diocese of Duvno. They asked the nuncio in Vienna, Austrian Empire to discuss the issue with the bishop of Bosnia who fled the Ottomans and resided in Đakovo, about establishing the new diocese. The Propaganda had another session on the matter in June 1735 and discussed the proposition of the Archbishop of Zadar about the reestablishment of the Diocese of Duvno. They also received an answer from the nuncio who informed them that the Austrian Emperor will not object to sending an apostolic vicar to Bosnia. Finally, the Propaganda agreed to grant the requests from the Catholics of Bosnia and Herzegovina, asking the archbishop of Zadar to propose them a suitable bishop.

The archbishop of Zadar made a suggestion that the jurisdiction of the apostolic vicariate should include the territory of the Diocese of Duvno, without an appointment of a special bishop of Duvno, in order to avoid the conflict with the archbishop of Split and bishop of Makarska. Finally, on 25 September 1735, Pope Clement XII granted the establishment of the Apostolic Vicariate of Bosnia.

The new Apostolic Vicar Bishop Mate Delivić, a Franciscan, made an apostolic visitation in whole Bosnia in 1736–37, but not in Herzegovina, due to the obstruction from the bishop of Makarska. Thus the new dispute arose between the bishop of Makarska and the archbishop of Split (who controlled parts of the territory around Livno) on one side, and the apostolic vicar of Bosnia and the other. The bishop of Makarska and the archbishop of Split tried to maintain their influence appointing the diocesan clergy in parishes, trying to replace the Franciscans. The new Apostolic Vicar, also a Franciscan, Bishop Pavao Dragičević, instructed the Franciscans that they must not allow any church function to any priest without his approval.

Bishop Stjepan Blašković of Makarska proposed a compromise solution to the Propaganda in 1759, that included the establishment of another diocese seated in Mostar that would include the territory of Herzegovina. The proposal was denied by the Propaganda.

Establishment 

Herzegovinian Franciscans, mostly from the monastery in Kreševo, who took pastoral care over Herzegovina, decided to establish their own monastery in Herzegovina in Široki Brijeg in 1840. Leaders of this initiative were Nikola Kordić, Anđeo Kraljević and Ilija Vidošević. At the time, Apostolic Vicar of Bosnia Rafael Barišić had an uneasy relationship with the Bosnian Franciscans. The Herzegovinian Franciscans established contact with Vizier of Herzegovina Ali Pasha Rizvanbegović was granted his own eyalet by the Ottoman sultan for his loyalty during the Bosnian uprising. The Franciscans considered that they will build their own monastery faster if the apostolic vicar would come to Herzegovina.

The vicar of Čerigaj friar Ilija Vidošević wrote to Bishop Rafael about the idea of establishing a separate Herzegovinian apostolic vicariate, an idea also supported by Ali Pasha. In 1843, Bishop Rafael returned from a trip in Albania and stayed in Čerigaj, where Fr. Ilija helped him to establish a connection with Ali Pasha. In 1844, the Church authorities allowed the Franciscans to build a monastery in Široki Brijeg, so the Herzegovinian Franciscans left their former monasteries to build a new one. In 1845, Bishop Rafael wrote to the Propaganda to allow him to move to Herzegovina, stating that form there, he would also serve the Diocese of Trebinje-Mrkan and that Catholics and Muslims there "all love him and want him, including the Vizier".

Their main argument for the establishment of a special vicariate was the number of parishes and the faithful Catholics in Herzegovina. According to a report from Bishop Augustin Miletić from 1818–19, Herzegovina had 8 parishes and 3100 Catholic families, with 20.223 Catholics in total. Ten years later, the same bishop reported that there were 51.744 Catholics, a third of the total number of Catholics in Bosnia and Herzegovina.

On 29 October 1845, Bishop Rafael informed the Propaganda that he will renounce his office as Apostolic Vicar in Bosnia. Rome and Istanbul entered the negotiations about the seat of Bishop Rafael, and both were compliant about his transfer to Herzegovina. The Church's negotiator was Mons. Anthony Petros IX Hassun. The secretary of the Propaganda wrote to Bishop Rafael on 13 March 1846, informing him about the success in the negotiations and called him to resign from the office of the Apostolic Vicar of Bosnia "as soon as possible", which he did.

On 29 April 1846, the Propaganda informed Bishop Rafael that he should move to Herzegovina immediately after he receives a ferman of approval from the Sultan. The next day the Rome established an independent vicariate for Herzegovina, and named Barišić the apostolic vicar. Around that time, Bishop Rafael, at the time in Istanbul, received the ferman, as well as two letters of approval from Ali Pasha. Bishop Rafael was granted a number of privileges, including the guarantee of freedom of religion. He informed the Propaganda about the approval on 26 May 1846. He left Istanbul for Trieste two days later and arrived in Herzegovina on 18 June 1846. The episcopal residence was being built in Vukodol near Mostar, while the Bishop resided in Seonica near Županjac (Duvno, present-day Tomislavgrad), where he established his curia. Seonica served as his seat from 18 June 1846 until 2 June 1851. As the existing land parcel in Vukodol was too small for a residence, Ali Pasha bought privately-owned land from a local Muslim and granted it to the Vicariate, with strong opposition from the Muslim locals. Ali Pasha also provided the protection during the construction. The construction was completed at the beginning of 1851, and Bishop Rafael moved there on 2 June 1851.

After the bishop moved in Mostar, the religious life of the local Catholics flourished. The Catholics from the neighboring hills around Mostar returned to the city and became involved in the public, cultural, and political life of the city.

In June 1861, Bishop Rafael became seriously ill. His health deteriorated in 1862, so he moved from Mostar to the Franciscan monastery in Široki Brijeg.

Nevertheless, made efforts to build a cathedral church. On 27 May 1862, with the help of Omar Pasha, Bishop Rafael was granted land in the centre of Mostar, previously a garden owned by Ali Pasha. The Governor of Mostar reluctantly gave Bishop Rafael the approval to build the church on 13 March 1863. However, Bishop Rafael never managed to lay the cornerstone of the new church, as he died soon afterward on 14 August 1863.

Bishop Anđeo Kraljević 

On 7 December 1864, Bishop Rafael was succeeded by Fr. Anđeo Kraljević, also a Franciscan and Custos of the Franciscan Custody of Herzegovina. He was consecrated a bishop in Zadar on 25 March 1865 and installed as apostolic vicar on 13 June 1865. Bishop Anđeo was one of the leaders of the initiative for the establishment of the Apostolic Vicariate in Herzegovina back in the 1840s.

Bishop Anđeo started the construction of the cathedral church, initiated by Bishop Anđeo. On 7 March 1866, he blessed the cornerstone of the church, which was finally built in 1872, when the bishop consecrated it to the apostles Peter and Paul. Thus the seat of the vicariate was moved from Vukodol to the new church. The next year, 1873, the parish residence was built next to it.

Bishop Anđeo entered into a conflict with the Franciscan Custody of Herzegovina, due to the Franciscans controlling all of the parishes in Herzegovina, while Bishop Anđeo, even though a Franciscan himself, wanted to have diocesan clergy at his disposal. In 1878, he wrote to the nuncio in Vienna about the necessity of the introduction of the diocesan clergy in the vicariate because the head of the Franciscan Custody had all authority, with the apostolic vicar being only a figurehead that confirms his decisions. He also asked him to lobby with the Holy See to establish a diocese so he can found new parishes that will be controlled by the diocesan clergy, with the Franciscans retaining the rest of parishes.

The Franciscans of Herzegovina were on bad terms with the Bishop Anđeo, claiming he didn't give them enough of the collected alms for the construction of the monastery in Humac. An anonymous letter was sent to Emperor Franz Joseph of Austria-Hungary, claiming the bishop is giving donations sent to him by Austria-Hungary to the Ottomans and accused him of being a turkophile. The Franciscan Custody barred itself from this letter. In February 1877, Bishop Anđeo requested from the Propaganda to send an apostolic visitor in Herzegovina and accused Paškal Buconjić, at the time guardian of the Humac monastery, of negligence towards the parishes and the Herzegovinian Franciscans of taking the payment for maintenance by force from the believers during the Easter Communion. The Congregation named Bishop Casimir Forlani the apostolic visitor, and he arrived in Mostar in February the next year. Forlani finished the report in May 1878, and advised Bishop to act in agreement with the Franciscans and to record revenues and expenditures, as well as to help the construction of the monastery in Humac. The question of the parishes remained unresolved.

Abolishment 

Bishop Anđeo Kraljević, died on 27 July 1879 while on a chrismian visitation in Konjic. Herzegovinian Franciscans' choice for his succession was Fr. Paškal Buconjić. Due to his loyalty to Austria-Hungary, the Austrian-Hungarian authorities lobbied for Fr. Paškal to succeed Bishop Anđeo, with the recommendation from the apostolic vicar of Bosnia, Bishop Paškal Vuičić. Pope Leo XIII approved his nomination and issued two decrees on 30 January 1880, one by which he appointed Fr. Paškal the apostolic vicar and the other by which he was appointed a titular bishop of Magydus. In order to enhance the connection between Herzegovina and Croatia, Fr. Paškal was consecrated a bishop in Zagreb by the Archbishop of Zagreb Cardinal Josip Mihalović on 19 March 1880, after which Bishop Paškal visited Emperor in Vienna and Pope in Rome. He was finally installed as the apostolic vicar on 25 April 1880. His episcopal motto was "All for the faith and homeland".

His choice to be consecrated in Zagreb and not by some neighbouring bishops, enabled Herzegovina to eliminate the dominance of the Bosnian Franciscans, who, with the help from Bishop of Đakovo Josip Juraj Strossmayer, tried to control it. Bishop Paškal worked steadily on his career. With the Austrian-Hungarian occupation of Bosnia and Herzegovina in 1878, the chances for Buconjić to become a residential bishop with the reintroduction of the regular Church hierarchy became palpable, unlike those of the Apostolic Vicar of Bosnia Bishop Paškal Vuičić.

In March 1880, Cardinal Mihalović and Bishop Paškal discussed the organisation of the Church in Bosnia and Herzegovina. While in Vienna during the Spring of 1880, Bishop Paškal met with Apostolic Nuncio to Austria-Hungary, Cardinal Domenico Jacobini, who later consulted Cardinal Josip Mihalović about the organisation of the Church in Bosnia and Herzegovina. Both of them became impressed with Bishop Paškal.

With the Austrian-Hungarian occupation of Bosnia and Herzegovina in 1878, and signing of the Convention between Austria-Hungary and the Holy See on 8 June 1881, the ground for episcopal nominations was established. According to the Convention, the Emperor had an exclusive right on the bishop appointment in Bosnia and Herzegovina. Pope Leo XIII with the apostolic bull Ex hac augusta from 5 July 1881, restored the regular Church hierarchy in Bosnia and Herzegovina. Pope established the Archdiocese of Vrhbosna with the seat in Sarajevo and subordinated to it three other dioceses: the newly established Diocese of Banja Luka, the already existing Diocese of Trebinje-Mrkan (under the apostolic administration from the bishop of Dubrovnik at the time) and the Diocese of Mostar-Duvno, to which he added the title of bishop of Duvno as well. The Diocese of Mostar-Duvno encompassed the territory of the Apostolic Vicariate of Herzegovina, which was thus abolished.

Due to his previous pro-Austrian stances, Minister of Finances Josip Szlávy nominated Bishop Paškal for the post of the residential bishop of Mostar-Duvno to the Emperor, who agreed and appointed Bishop Paškal the new residential bishop on 9 October 1881. The Emperor's appointment was sent to Rome for the official confirmation and Pope Leo XIII proclaimed Bishop Paškal the residential bishop on 18 November 1881, at the same time resolving him of the title of Bishop of Magydus.

List of apostolic vicars

References

Bibliography

Books

Journals 
 
 
 

Apostolic vicariates
Catholic Church in Bosnia and Herzegovina
Religious organizations established in 1846
1846 establishments in the Ottoman Empire
1846 establishments in Europe
1881 disestablishments in Austria-Hungary
Disestablishments in the Empire of Austria (1867–1918)